Khorosheve is an urban-type settlement in Kharkiv Raion of Kharkiv Oblast in Ukraine. It is located on the right bank of the Udy, in the drainage basin of the Don, south of the city of Kharkiv. Khorosheve belongs to Bezliudivka settlement hromada, one of the hromadas of Ukraine. Population:

Economy

Transportation
Zhykhor railway station is located in Khorosheve, on the railway connecting Kharkiv and Sloviansk via Izium. Local passenger trains stop at the station.

The settlement has road access to Highway M18 connecting Kharkiv with Dnipro and Zaporizhzhia.

References

Urban-type settlements in Kharkiv Raion